The 2023 UCLA Bruins baseball team represent the University of California, Los Angeles during the 2023 NCAA Division I baseball season. The Bruins play their home games at Jackie Robinson Stadium as a member of the Pac-12 Conference. They are led by head coach John Savage, in his 19th season at UCLA.

Previous season

The Bruins finished with a record of 40–24, and 19–11 in conference play  In the postseason, the Bruins were invited and participated in the 2022 NCAA Division I baseball tournament, where they lost to Auburn in the Auburn Regional in Auburn, Alabama.

Personnel

Roster

Coaches

Schedule

|-
! style=""| Regular Season: 14–3 (Home: 11–0; Away: 3–3 Neutral: 0–0)
|- valign="top" 
|

Rankings

References

External links 
 UCLA Bruins baseball

UCLA Bruins
UCLA Bruins baseball seasons
UCLA Bruins baseball